Tawang Air Force station in Arunachal Pradesh in India has a functional heliport and fixed-wing "Advanced Landing Ground" (AGL) capable of handling Lockheed Martin C-130J Super Hercules transport aircraft. The Indian Air Force (IAF) has since 2016 upgraded 8 ALG in Arunachal Pradesh and made those operation by 2018, all of which has been offered for the operation of civil helicopter and flights for tourism and the UDAN scheme.

History
Tawang AFS was established by the Government of India due to the border security needs of the country from the northeastern side, where different states, especially Arunachal Pradesh, share their borders with China. With its status as a heliport, this airport also plays a pivotal role in maintaining the system for security training and monitoring. Radar was installed here in 2010-11.

The Indian Army started to upgrade the Tawang AFS with a runway for the fixed wing aircraft capable of allowing the landing of large and heavy transport aircraft including newly acquired C-130J Super Hercules.

Northeast connectivity

Nearby civil airports
Nearby airports Lokpriya Gopinath Bordoloi International Airport at Guwahati and Salonibari Airport at Tezpur are located at a distance of 450 and 325 kilometers, respectively.

As of November 2018, helicopter air connectivity under the UDAN Scheme was operational from the AGLs and heliports at Pasighat, Aalo, Itanagar, Tuting, Walong, Yingkiong, and Ziro.

Annual connectivity summit

The "North East Connectivity Summit" is held annually for the development of rail, road, air and tourist connectivity of the Northeast India.

See also
 Tawang related
 Bhalukpong-Tawang railway
 Sela Tunnel
 Bum La Pass
 List of airports in Arunachal Pradesh
 List of airports in India

 Military bases 
 List of ALGs
 List of Indian Air Force stations
 India-China military deployment on LAC
 List of disputed India-China areas
 Tianwendian
 Ukdungle

 Borders
 Line of Actual Control (LAC)
 Borders of China
 Borders of India
 
 Conflicts
 Sino-Indian conflict
 List of disputed territories of China
 List of disputed territories of India

 Other related topics
 India-China Border Roads
 List of extreme points of India
 Defence Institute of High Altitude Research
 Independent Golden Jubilee Government Higher Secondary School, Pasighat

References

External links 
 IAF's ALG
 Town website

Tawang district
Airports in Arunachal Pradesh
Indian Air Force bases